Senator Beach may refer to:

Bob Beach (born 1959), West Virginia State Senate
Brandon Beach (born 1961), Georgia State Senate
George Beach (politician) (1817–?), New York State Senate
James Beach (born 1946), New Jersey State Senate
Nelson J. Beach (1800–1876), New York State Senate
William Beach (American politician) (1810s–1860), New York State Senate
Zadoc P. Beach (1861–after 1933), Wisconsin State Senate